This is an incomplete list of Statutory Instruments of the United Kingdom in 1949. This listing is the complete, 34 items, "Partial dataset" as listed on www.legislation.gov.uk (as at March 2014).

Statutory Instruments

1-999
The Army and Air Force (Women's Service) (Adaptation of Enactments) Order 1949 SI 1949/61
The Fire Services (Pensionable Employment) Regulations  1949 SI 1949/71
The Companies (Winding-up) Rules, 1949 SI 1949/330
The Double Taxation Relief (Taxes on Income) (Grenada) Order, 1949 SI 1949/361
The Local Government (Compensation) (Amendment) Regulations 1949 SI 1949/489
The National Assistance (Compensation) (Amendment) Regulations, 1949 SI 1949/490
The Superannuation (Local Government Staffs) (National Service) Rules 1949 SI 1949/545
The Hill Farming Improvements Order 1949 SI 1949/548
The Pension Schemes (Employees in Northern Ireland) Regulations 1949 SI 1949/584
The Railway and Canal Commission (Abolition) Act, (Commencement) Order, 1949 SI 1949/603
The Trading with the Enemy (Authorisation) (Germany) Order, 1949 SI 1949/605
The Trading with the Enemy (Transfer of Negotiable Instruments, etc.) (Germany) Order 1949 SI 1949/606
The Superannuation (Local Act Authorities Schemes) Interchange Rules 1949 SI 1949/630
The Local Government Superannuation (England and Scotland) (Amendment) Regulations 1949 SI 1949/631
The Coal Industry (Superannuation Scheme) (Winding Up, No. 1) Regulations 1949 SI 1949/917

1000-1999
The Superannuation Schemes (War Service) (End of Emergency) Order, 1949 SI 1949/1053
The Trading with the Enemy (Custodian) Order 1949 SI 1949/1083
The Stopping Up of Highways (Norfolk) (No. 1) Order, 1949 SI 1949/1198
The Superannuation (Approved Employment) Rules 1949 SI 1949/1327
The National Insurance (Pensions, Existing Contributors) (Transitional) Amendment (No. 2) Regulations 1949 SI 1949/1412
The Superannuation (Local Government, Social Workers and Health Education Staff) Interchange Rules, 1949 SI 1949/1465
The Superannuation (Reckoning of Certain Previous Service) Rules 1949 SI 1949/1803
The Agricultural Wages Board Regulations 1949 SI 1949/1884
The Agricultural Wages Committees Regulations 1949 SI 1949/1885
The Federated Superannuation System for Universities (Temporary Service) Regulations 1949 SI 1949/1890
The Federated Superannuation System for Universities (War Service) Regulations 1949 SI 1949/1891

2000-2999
The Isles of Scilly (Importation of Animals Regulations) Orders, 1949 SI 1949/2012
The Agricultural Marketing (Public Inquiry) Rules 1949 SI 1949/2094
The Superannuation (Governors of Dominions, etc.) Rules 1949 SI 1949/2114
The Federated Superannuation System for Universities (Temporary Service) (Amendment) Regulations 1949 SI 1949/2116
The Hill Farming Improvements (Piers, etc.) Order 1949 SI 1949/2169
The Fire Services (Pensionable Employment) (No. 2) Regulations 1949 SI 1949/2216
The Blasting (Castings and Other Articles) Special Regulations, 1949 SI 1949/2225
The Statutory Orders (Special Procedure) (Substitution) Order 1949 SI 1949/2393

Unreferenced Listings
The following 9 items were previously listed on this article, however are unreferenced on the authorities site, included here for a "no loss" approach.
Coffin Furniture and Cerement-Making Wages Council (Great Britain) (Constitution) Order, 1949 SI 1949/3
Cooked Beetroot (Revocation) Order, 1949 SI 1949/5
Citizenship Law (New Zealand) Order, 1949 SI 1949/7
Act of Sederunt (Sheriff Court Fees) 1949 SI 1949/9
Packing of Explosive for Conveyance Rules 1949 SI 1949/798
Birmingham—Great Yarmouth Trunk Road (High House and Other Diversions) Order 1949 SI 1949/1544
Dry Cleaning Special Regulations 1949 SI 1949/2224
Copy-right (Industrial Design) Rules 1949 SI 1949/2367
Designs Rules 1949 SI 1949/2368

References

External links
Legislation.gov.uk delivered by the UK National Archive
UK SI's on legislation.gov.uk
UK Draft SI's on legislation.gov.uk

See also
List of Statutory Instruments of the United Kingdom

Lists of Statutory Instruments of the United Kingdom
Statutory Instruments